Successful Croatia was a political alliance in Croatia formed in 2015 by People's Party - Reformists and Forward Croatia-Progressive Alliance. The parties signed the coalition agreement on 18 August 2015.

Members

See also 
 2015 Croatian parliamentary election

References

2015 establishments in Croatia
2016 disestablishments in Croatia
Defunct political party alliances in Croatia